The South River Friends Meetinghouse, or Quaker Meeting House, is a historic Friends meeting house located at Lynchburg, Virginia. It was completed in 1798. The building ceased as a Quaker meeting house in the 1840s, and stands on the grounds of the Quaker Memorial Presbyterian Church. Adjacent to the structure is a historic graveyard. Buried there are Sarah Lynch (in an unmarked grave) and her son John, the founder of the city whose final resting place is marked by a plain Quaker stone and a modern plaque.

It was listed on the National Register of Historic Places in 1975.

References

External links
South River Quaker Meeting House, 5810 Fort Avenue, Lynchburg, VA: 2 photos, 1 data page, and 1 photo caption page, at Historic American Buildings Survey

Historic American Buildings Survey in Virginia
Churches on the National Register of Historic Places in Virginia
Churches completed in 1791
18th-century Quaker meeting houses
Quaker meeting houses in Virginia
Quakerism in Virginia
Churches in Lynchburg, Virginia
National Register of Historic Places in Lynchburg, Virginia